The Optional Municipal Charter Law or Faulkner Act (et seq.) provides New Jersey municipalities with a variety of models of local government.  This legislation is called the Faulkner Act in honor of the late Bayard H. Faulkner, former mayor of Montclair, New Jersey and chairman of the Commission on Municipal Government.

Overview
The Faulkner Act offers four basic plans (mayor–council, council–manager, small municipality, and mayor–council–administrator) and two procedures by which the voters of a municipality can adopt one of these plans. The Act provides many choices for communities with a preference for a strong executive and professional management of municipal affairs. Twenty-one percent of the municipalities in New Jersey, including the four most populous cities (Newark, Jersey City, Paterson and Elizabeth) all govern under the provisions of the Faulkner Act. More than half of all New Jersey residents reside in municipalities with Faulkner Act charters.

In all Faulkner Act municipalities, regardless of the particular form, citizens enjoy the right of initiative and referendum, meaning that proposed ordinances can be introduced directly by the people without action by the local governing body. This right is exercised by preparing a conforming petition signed by 10% of the registered voters who turned out in the last general election in an odd-numbered year (i. the most recent General Assembly election). Once the petition is submitted, the local governing body can vote to pass the requested ordinance, and if they refuse, it is then submitted directly to the voters.

History

The Faulkner Act was created to provide municipalities with greater flexibility than provided in New Jersey's traditional forms of government (city, township, borough, town and village) and to expand on the reforms provided in the Walsh Act and the 1923 Municipal Manager Law.

As originally enacted in 1950, the Faulkner Act provided for three forms of government: mayor–council, council–manager, and small municipality. Within each form, letter codes designated predefined aspects of each form and its individual arrangement of options, such as partisan or nonpartisan elections, concurrent or staggered terms, all at large or a combination of ward and at large seats.

In 1981, the Faulkner Act was significantly amended. The letter codes were eliminated, and the number of varieties within each plan was greatly increased. The council–manager plan was amended to include the option of having a mayor chosen by the electorate. A new form, mayor–council–administrator, was added. Municipalities were also given greater flexibility to amend their Faulkner Act charter without having to place the entire charter on the ballot.

Forms of government

There are four forms available to municipalities through the Faulkner Act:

Mayor–council 
The mayor–council form features a mayor with strong powers and a city council with five to nine members. Municipalities under this plan establish three to ten executive departments, headed by a director appointed by the mayor with the consent of the council.

This form of government provides for election of a mayor and five, seven, or nine council members. All council members may be elected at large, or some may be elected by wards; they may be partisan or nonpartisan, and serve four-year concurrent or staggered terms. There may be up to ten administrative departments. Mayors in this system are vested with broad executive power.

The following municipalities have adopted mayor–council system under the Faulkner Act:

Council–manager 
The council–manager plan places complete responsibility for municipal affairs in the council. The council appoints a municipal manager who is the chief executive with broad authority. While the council–manager plan is quite similar to the 1923 Municipal Manager Law, the Faulkner Act version does not provide tenure for the municipal manager, who can be removed by a vote of the council.

The council consists of five, seven, or nine members elected either at-large or a combination of at-large and by wards for four-year terms. The mayor - who is either elected at-large or by council from among its members for a four-year term - chairs the council, but has no appointment or veto power. The council hires a manager, who serves as the chief executive and administrative official. The manager prepares the budget, appoints and removes department heads, and attends council meetings, but does not have a vote.

The following municipalities have adopted council–manager system under the Faulkner Act:

Small municipality 
The small municipality plan can be adopted by communities with a population of fewer than 12,000. All legislative powers are vested in the council with the mayor presiding over council sessions and having both voice and vote. The small municipality form is essentially a blend of the features in the traditional borough and township forms of government.

Voters select either three, five, or seven council members or a mayor and two, four, or six council members. Council members are elected at-large. Council serves three-year concurrent or staggered terms. An elected Mayor, if provided for, is elected by voters and serves a four-year term. Elections may be partisan or non-partisan. An organization meeting for the governing body is held on January 1 for partisan municipalities; July 1 for non-partisan ones.

The mayor, whether elected by voters or a council, presides over the council with voice and vote, but has no veto powers; exercises executive power of the municipality; appoints council committees; and appoints the municipal clerk, attorney, tax assessor, tax collector, and the treasurer, all with council confirmation. A Council-elected mayor serves a term of one or three years, depending on whether terms are staggered or concurrent.

The council exercises legislative power of the municipality and also approves mayor's appointees for municipal clerk, attorney, tax assessor, tax collector and treasurer.

The Mayor exercises executive power of the municipality; however council may create an administrator by ordinance.

In a July 2011 report, the Rutgers University Center for Government Studies listed 18 municipalities as operating under the Faulkner Act small municipality form of government:

 Allamuchy Township, New Jersey
 Belmar, New Jersey
 Berlin Township, New Jersey
 Bradley Beach, New Jersey
 Chester Township, New Jersey
 Clinton Township, New Jersey
 East Hanover Township, New Jersey
 Egg Harbor City, New Jersey (city website says small municipality, though source says that city form of government is used)
 Estell Manor, New Jersey
 Fairfield Township, Essex County, New Jersey
 Greenwich Township, Gloucester County, New Jersey
 Highlands, New Jersey
 Island Heights, New Jersey
 Lambertville, New Jersey
 Logan Township, New Jersey
 Lopatcong Township, New Jersey
 Pohatcong Township, New Jersey
 Stafford Township, New Jersey
 Woodland Park, New Jersey

Mayor–council–administrator 
The mayor–council–administrator form is largely the borough form with the addition of an appointed professional administrator. Unlike the three other Faulkner Act plans, the mayor–council–administrator offers no optional variations in structure.

Voters elect a mayor and six council members at large for staggered terms with partisan elections. The mayor serves a four-year term; council members serve three-year terms. An organization meeting is held on January 1.  The mayor is the chief executive of the municipality, and appoints the positions of municipal clerk, administrator, attorney, tax collector, treasurer and other department heads with approval by the council.  The mayor can also dismiss these department heads upon written notice to the council.  The mayor also has veto power subject to override by 2/3 of council members, and can vote on council matters in the result of a tie vote.  This form of government also includes a municipal administrator who supervises the departments.

The following municipalities have adopted the mayor–council–administrator form of government under the Faulkner Act:

Change in form 
A Charter Study Commission is one of two options available to residents of New Jersey to pursue a change in their form of government. The other option is a direct petition. The charter study commission approach is only available under the Faulkner Act.

A charter study commission can be elected, most often when residents are dissatisfied with the existing form of government, but there is no agreement as to what new form should be implemented.

A ballot question to form a charter study commission can be performed through a petition or by the existing municipal governing body enacting an ordinance to form a commission. Voters simultaneously vote yes / no to form a commission and also vote to select its members (if it passes), with the top five candidates becoming the members of the commission.

A charter study commission can recommend that the municipality change to one of the Faulkner Act forms of government, a choice that must be ratified by the voters within the municipality. The charter study commission also may recommend a Special Charter, with further action being required, but the study commission by the New Jersey Legislature to approve the recommended variant form of government.

Some municipal governments have appointed a charter study committee (in contrast to the charter study commission). A charter study committee operates on a purely advisory basis. While it may perform the same research functions as a commission, a committee cannot place its recommendations on the ballot, but must do so via the petition method.

See also
Walsh Act
1923 Municipal Manager Law
List of municipalities in New Jersey

References

External links
New Jersey State League of Municipalities
New Jersey League of Women Voters

 
New Jersey statutes
1950 in New Jersey
1950 in law
Local government legislation
History of local government in the United States